The contrabass saxophone is the second-lowest-pitched extant member of the saxophone family proper. It is extremely large (twice the length of tubing of the baritone saxophone, with a bore twice as wide, standing 1.9 meters tall, or 6 feet 4 inches) and heavy (approximately 20 kilograms, or 45 pounds), is pitched in the key of E, one octave below the baritone saxophone.

History
The contrabass saxophone was part of the original saxophone family as conceived by Adolphe Sax, and is included in his saxophone patent of 1846, as well as in Kastner's concurrently published Methode for saxophone. By 1849, Sax was displaying contrabass through sopranino saxophones at exhibitions. Patrick Gilmore's famous American band roster included a contrabass saxophone in 1892, and at least a dozen of these instruments were built by the Evette-Schaeffer company for the US military bands in the early 20th century. Saxophone ensembles were also popular at this time, and the contrabass saxophone was an eye-catching novelty for the groups that were able to obtain one. By the onset of the Great Depression, the saxophone craze had ended,  and the contrabass, already rare, almost disappeared from public view.

Modern instruments
In the early 2000s the contrabass saxophone experienced a resurgence in interest. Although still rare and expensive, three manufacturers now produce contrabass saxophones: Benedikt Eppelsheim (inventor and producer of the tubax), Romeo Orsi , and J’Élle Stainer.

Use
Due to its large body and wide bore, the sound of the contrabass saxophone has great acoustical presence and a very rich tone. It can be smooth and mellow, or harsh and buzzy depending on the player, and on the mouthpiece and reed combination used. Its middle and upper registers are warm, full, and expressive. Because its deepest tones vibrate so slowly (as with the contrabassoon or pedal notes on a pipe organ) it can be difficult for listeners to perceive individual pitches at the bottom of its range; instead of hearing a clearly delineated melody, listeners may instead hear a series of rattling tones with little pitch definition. However, when these tones are reinforced by another instrument playing at the octave or fifteenth, they sound clearly defined and have tremendous resonance and presence. In some contemporary jazz/classical ensembles the contrabass saxophone doubles the baritone saxophone either at the same pitch or an octave below, depending on the register of the music.

In classical music
While there are few orchestral works that call specifically for the contrabass saxophone, the growing number of contrabass saxophonists has led to the creation of an increasing body of solo and chamber music literature. It is particularly effective as a foundation for large ensembles of saxophones. As an example, the eminent saxophonist Sigurd Raschèr (1907-2001) played the instrument in his Raschèr Saxophone Ensemble, and it is featured on most of the albums by the Nuclear Whales Saxophone Orchestra. The Scottish composer Alistair Hinton has included parts for soprano, alto, baritone and contrabass saxophones in his Concerto for 22 Instruments completed in 2005.

In rock and jazz music
Since 2004, the rock group Violent Femmes have incorporated the contrabass saxophone into the band's live performances as well as their newest albums. Blaise Garza's contrabass saxophone often plays in unison with the bass guitar, and is featured heavily on their ninth studio album, We Can Do Anything.

Anthony Braxton has occasionally used contrabass saxophone in jazz and improvised music, as on The Aggregate (1988), Four Compositions (GTM) 2000 (2003), or Dortmund (Quartet) 1976 (1991).

Performers
The contrabass saxophone has most frequently been used as a solo instrument by woodwind players in the genres of jazz and improvised music who are searching for an extreme or otherworldly tone. The difficulty of holding and controlling the instrument (let alone playing it) makes performing on the instrument a somewhat theatrical experience in and of itself. On older instruments, playing is difficult too; it takes an enormous amount of air to sound notes in the low register. Thanks to refinements in their acoustical designs and keywork, modern contrabass saxophones are no more difficult to play than most other saxophones.

An increasing number of performers and recording artists are making use of the instrument, including Anthony Braxton, Paul Cohen, David Brutti, Jay C. Easton, Randy Emerick, Blaise Garza, Marcel W. Helland, Robert J. Verdi, Joseph Donald Baker, Thomas K. J. Mejer, Douglas Pipher,  Scott Robinson, Klaas Hekman, Daniel Gordon, Daniel Kientzy, and Todd A. White. It is also used by saxophone ensembles including the Raschèr Saxophone Orchestra Lörrach, Saxophone Sinfonia, National Saxophone Choir of Great Britain, Zurich Saxophone Collective, Northstar Saxophone Quartet, Koelner Saxophone Mafia, Toronto-based Allsax4tet and the Nuclear Whales Saxophone Orchestra.

References

External links
 J’Élle Stainer
 Contrabass saxophone page from www.contrabass.com website
 Contrabass saxophone page from Jay C. Easton's web site
 Really Big Blues
 "Bahamut" by Hazmat Modine (click "Bahamut" to listen)
 MP3 excerpt of "Polpis Dreaming" by Carson P. Cooman, op. 410 (2002) for contrabass saxophone and piano, performed by Jay C. Easton
 Video of Marcel W. Helland playing a Contrabass Saxophone.

Saxophones
Contrabass instruments
E-flat instruments